Chopra is a Punjabi Khatri clan and surname. They belonged to the Barah-Ghar / Bahri family-group of the Khatris, which also includes the clans of Dhawan, Kakkar, Kapoor, Khanna, Mehra, Malhotra, Sehgal, Seth, Tandon, Talwar, and Vohra.

The Chopra clan claims to originate from one man called "Chaupat Rai" who was killed in a battle with Sultan Mahmud of Ghazni. His descendants who were born before his death took the name of their forefather and hence came to be known as Chopra. Most Chopras are Hindu, with a minority also being Sikh.

Diwan Mulraj and Diwan Sawan Mal were from Chopra Khatri families and served as army generals under Maharaja Ranjit Singh of Sikh Empire. Sawan Mal Chopra was renowned for capturing Multan from the rule of Afghans while Mulraj was known to have rebelled against the British which led to the 2nd Anglo-Sikh war. The ancestors of the Chopras were expert gamblers ,so much so that they were called the incarnation of Maharaja Nala.

They were concentrated in Majha region of Punjab in modern-day countries of India and Pakistan which includes Gujranwala, Amritsar, Lahore etc. Dr. Satyapal, a prominent freedom fighter from Gujranwala who was arrested by the British along with Saifuddin Kitchlew was a Chopra Khatri. Kavi Tahikan was a soldier by profession who also served as one of the 52 poets/writers of Guru Gobind Singh belonged to a Chopra family of Jalalpur town of Gujrat district.

Notable people 
People listed may or may not be affiliated to the clans or the religions, include:

Athletes 

 Aakash Chopra (born 1977), Indian cricketer who played for the Indian cricket team from late 2003 until late 2004
 Ajmer Singh Chopra, Indian basketball player who was awarded the Arjuna Award. He represented the country in the 1980 Olympics.
 Anjum Chopra (born 1977), former captain of India national women's cricket team
 Aryan Chopra, Indian chess prodigy who became a grandmaster (GM) in 2016, at the age of 14 years.
 Daniel Chopra (born 1973), Swedish professional golfer with highest International ranking of 60.
 Keshav Chopra, American tennis player who won the IMG Academy 2019 Student Male Athlete of the Year Award
 Michael Chopra (born 1983), English footballer who played for Sunderland F.C, Cardiff City & Ipswich Town
Nikhil Chopra (born 1973), retired Indian cricketer; cricket analyst
Neeraj Chopra (born 1997) Olympic gold medal winner for India at 2020 Tokyo Olympics
Pranav Chopra, Indian badminton player with highest international ranking in Mixed Doubles being 13.
Prashant Chopra, Indian cricketer. He was in the 2012 ICC Under-19 Cricket World Cup champion India Team. 
Rajneesh Chopra, Indian cricketer
Varun Chopra (born 1987), English cricketer, captained the English U-19 cricket team
Varun Chopra (born 2000), Irish cricketer
Vijay Chopra, Indian cricketer
Kuldip Chand Chopra (born 1931), Indian Volleyball, captained the Indian team

Authors 

 Ashok Chopra, Indian author
 Deepak Chopra (born 1946), Indian medical doctor, public speaker, and writer on subjects such as spirituality and Ayurveda 
 Gotham Chopra (born 1975), American author and entertainment/media entrepreneur
 Mohan Chopra (1921–1969), Hindi intellectual
 Mallika Chopra (born 1972), Indian American author and businesswoman
 Pushpinder Singh Chopra, Indian military historian and the author of several books, chiefly on military aviation
 Saloni Chopra, Indian author
 Shaili Chopra, Indian business journalist, author and entrepreneur. She is the founder of SheThePeople.
 Zuni Chopra, Indian author best known for her novel The House That Spoke.

Directors 

 Aditya Chopra (born 1971), Indian film producer, screenwriter and director
 Baldev Raj Chopra (1914–2008), Indian director and producer of Bollywood movies and television serials
 Jagmohan Chopra, Indian printmaker, painter and photographer who promoted printmaking in India. 
 Joyce Chopra (born 1936), American director and writer of feature films and television
 Pamela Chopra, Indian film producer, playback singer and writer
 Ravi Chopra (born 1946), Indian movie producer and director
 Tanuj Chopra, American filmmaker
 Vidhu Vinod Chopra (born 1952), Indian director and producer
 Vikram Chopra, Indian film director, screenwriter, and actor
Yash Chopra (1932 - 2012), Indian filmmaker, film director, screenwriter, and Bollywood producer

Executives 

 Amarjit Chopra, Indian chartered accountant who served as the president of Institute of Chartered Accountants of India (ICAI)
 Aneesh Chopra (born 1972), the first Federal Chief Technology Officer of the United States (CTO)
Deepak Chopra (Canada Post), President and chief executive officer of Canada Post Corporation
Rohit Chopra,  American consumer advocate who is the 3rd director of the Consumer Financial Protection Bureau
Sanjeev Chopra (born 1961), ex-Indian Civil Servant, former director at LBSNAA

Film Actors 

 Akshat Chopra, Indian child film actor, model, dancer, anchor
 Deeya Chopra (born 1983), Indian television actor
 Gaurav Chopra (born 1967), Indian television and theatre actor
 Harshad Chopra (born 1983), Indian television actor
 Meera Chopra (born 1983), Indian film actress who appears in Telugu and Tamil films
 Parineeti Chopra (born 1988), Indian actress
 Pransh Chopra (born 1984), Indian film actor who appears in Bollywood films
Prem Chopra (born 1935), actor in Hindi and Punjabi films
Priyanka Chopra (born 1982), Indian actress and former Miss World
Roshni Chopra (born 1980), Indian actress, television presenter and the winner of NDTV Imagine's reality show, Dil Jeetegi Desi Girl
Tisca Chopra (born 1973), Indian film actress, most known for her role in Taare Zameen Par (2007)
Uday Chopra (born 1973), Bollywood actor, producer, and assistant director
Ujjwal Chopra, Indian actor

Journalists 

 Anupama Chopra (born 1967), author, journalist and film critic
 Ashwini Kumar Chopra, senior journalist and resident editor of the Punjab Kesari
 Shaili Chopra (born 1981), Senior Editor and lead female anchor at ET Now, the Economic Times business news channel
 Pran Chopra, Indian journalist, political analyst and newspaper editor.
 Vijay Kumar Chopra (born 1932), Indian journalist editor-in-chief of Punjab Kesari and the second son of Lala Jagat Narain

Models 

 Gurleen Kaur Chopra, Indian model and actress
 Pooja Chopra (born 1986), Indian model who won the title of Femina Miss India World 2009.
 Sherlyn Chopra (born 1984), Indian model, singer, actress and model

Military officers 

 Anil Chopra, Air Marshal in Indian Air Force
 Anil Chopra, Vice Admiral in Indian Navy

Politicians 

 Subhash Chopra, Indian politician from Delhi.
 Suneet Chopra, Indian politician and trade unionist

Scientists and academics 

 Bashambhar Nath Chopra, Indian zoologist
 G. P. Chopra, Indian educationist, credited with the establishment of several educational institutions in India
 Jagjit Singh Chopra, Indian neurologist, medical writer and an Emeritus Professor at PGIMER
 Kasturi Lal Chopra, Indian materials physicist and a former director of the IIT Kharagpur
 Ram Nath Chopra,  Indian Medical Service officer. He is considered the "Father of Indian Pharmacology" for his work on pharmaceuticals 
 Renu Khanna Chopra, Indian scientist
 Sanjiv Chopra (born 1949), Professor of Medicine and Faculty Dean for Continuing Medical Education at Harvard Medical School
Shiv Chopra, Canadian microbiologist and human rights activist
Virender Lal Chopra, Indian biotechnologist and director-general of the Indian Council of Agricultural Research with contributions in improving the wheat production of India
Vineet Chopra, Indian–American hospitalist. Chopra has served as chair of the Department of Medicine at the University of Colorado School of Medicine

References

Indian surnames
Surnames of Indian origin
Punjabi-language surnames
Hindu surnames
Khatri clans
Khatri surnames
Punjabi tribes

sv:Jater#C